Al-Hidayah (meaning "The Guidance") is a UK-based youth-oriented forum of Minhaj-ul-Quran UK. The organisation was founded in 2004. 

Al-Hidayah has been held as an annual three day residential retreat held at various locations in the United Kingdom under the spiritual guidance of Shaykh-ul-Islam Dr. Muhammad Tahir-ul-Qadri.

Al-Hidayah 2018 was held between the dates of 17–19 August 2018 at Fletcher Hotel Doorwerth-Arnhem in Arnhem under the spiritual guidance of Shaykh-ul-Islam, Dr. Muhammad Tahir-ul-Qadri.

Al-Hidayah 2005 (Pioneer Centre, Shropshire) 
In 2005, Minhaj-ul-Quran UK began 'Al-Hidayah', a series of annual three day residential educational and spiritual retreats, targeted at British Muslims, and inviting the foremost Islamic scholars from around the world.

Al-Hidayah 2005 was held in the Pioneer Centre, Shropshire under the spiritual guidance of his imminence Shaykh-ul-Islam Dr. Muhammad Tahir-ul-Qadri, head of Minhaj ul Quran International.

Over 300 young Muslims attended the three day event and due to its success the residential retreat has become an annual event. The aims and objectives of Al Hidayah were to provide British youth with true knowledge of Islamic teachings based on love, peace and humanity.

Al-Hidayah 2006 (Heythrop Park, Oxfordshire) 
Al-Hidayah 2006, was held between Friday 25 August to Monday 28 August 2006 in Heythrop Park, Oxfordshire. The main speaker at the event was Shaykh-ul-Islam Dr. Muhammad Tahir-ul-Qadri. The event was also attended by Shaykh Asad Muhammad Saeed as-Sagharji, who was a great scholar from the Islamic world.

The main feature of the event was the keynote speech of Shaykh-ul-Islam on the Life and Travels of Imam Bukhari. The organizers attracted more than 600 participants from United Kingdom and Europe and as far as the United States.

Al-Hidayah 2007 (Heythrop Park, Oxfordshire) 
The third annual Al-Hidayah Residential Spiritual and Educational Retreat took place at the same venue as the 2006 event, in Heythrop Park Oxfordshire.

Hundreds of participants from all over the United Kingdom and Europe came to benefit from the one in a lifetime opportunity of spending four days in the company of Shaykh-ul-Islam Dr. Muhammad Tahir-ul-Qadri.

The previous two retreats were life changing for the young participants, who were blessed with the opportunity of elevating their spirituality and have their inner selves purified from lusts of the material world and are filled with feelings of longing for the Creator.

Alongside being a Mufassir, Muhadith and Faqih; among a long list of responsibilities that Shaykh-ul-Islam has taken upon himself in order to carry out his work for the Ummah, he is also one of the greatest Sufi leaders of the time. He is the ultimate all-in-one entity perfectly qualified to meet all the needs of those who want to escape from the clutches of materialism. Knowledge alone is not sufficient for this, thus a mere scholar is unable to bring about these changes in his followers. It is only when oceans of knowledge merge with galaxies of spiritualism, does a person qualify to carry out such a task.

The venue selected by the Al-Hidayah organisers was the perfect environment for both gaining knowledge and also experiencing spiritual uplift. The peaceful and green surroundings together with the spiritual teachings and company of Shaykh-ul-Islam made the venue a practical fountain of Tazkiyyah, Ihsan and Tasawwuf. The venue also catered for all the needs of the participants including accommodating the needs of families with children, separate facilities for brothers and sisters such as gym, swimming pool, sports activities, excellent dining facilities and accommodation and much more.

Shaykh Asad Muhammad Saeed as-Sagharji, Damascus Syria, was the chief guest. Shaykh Abdurahman al-Hammami and Sayyid Muadh were also special guests from Syria. Shaykh Abdul-Hakim Murad (University of Cambridge), a renowned British scholar was a guest speaker.

Al-Hidayah 2009 (University of Warwick) 
Minhaj-ul-Quran UK organized a three-day annual "Al-Hidayah Youth Camp" at the University of Warwick in August 2009, which was attended by more than 1200 participants, from across the world. The participants started arriving at 9am on 8 August 2009. After the computerized verification of all delegates, they were issued passes. Renowned Syrian scholar, Shaykh Asad Muhammad Saeed as-Sagharji, delivered the first lecture to the participants on the subject of "Discipline & Morality". Shaykh Abdul-Hakim Murad Murad of University of Cambridge, another British scholar of immense erudition, delivered his talk on the importance of relations with other religions in a non-Muslim society.

The proceedings of the first day were punctuated with the occasional recitation from the Quran and presentation of Nasheed to keep the participants spiritually energized. In addition to Shaykh Abdur Rahman and his companions, the "Qawals" of Hassan Minhaj Naat Council kept the audience spiritually ecstatic with their presentations in Arabic, Urdu and Punjabi languages. Shaykh-ul-Islam Dr. Muhammad Tahir-ul-Qadri was given a standing ovation and huge round of applause upon his arrival in the hall as chief organizer Dr. Zahid Iqbal, welcomed Shaykh-ul-Islam and invited him to deliver his keynote speech.

Shaykh-ul-Islam made "Peace & Unity" the subject of his address. Former minister of Egypt, Prof Yahya Jamal, attended the camp on the first day and delivered a special lecture. The pictorial exhibition of renowned British photographer, Peter Sanders, who embraced Islam in 1991, was also the focus of people's attention. His pictures highlighted religious, social and sociological behaviour and trends in different societies. The participants liked the exhibition very much.

Dr Raheeq Ahmad Abbasi, Secretary General of Minhaj-ul-Quran, gave comprehensive briefing to the participants about the organizations worldwide network. The office bearers of Minhaj Welfare Foundation also gave briefing about their activities whose chief highlight was the ongoing project of ‘Aagosh’ (Orphan Care Home), which is estimated to cost 34 million rupees. The briefing also included details of Minhaj Welfare Foundation activities in other areas etc.

The highlight of the camp was the question & answer session. The panel, which asked questions, included Canon Dr Christopher Lamb, representative of Archbishop of Canterbury Dr Rowan Williams, Professor Ron Geaves, Professor of the Comparative Study of Religion, Liverpool Hope University, Dr Sophie Gilliat-Ray, Director, Centre for the Study of Islam in the UK, Cardiff University, Dr. Tahir Abbas, Director of the Centre for the Study of Ethnicity and Culture, University of Birmingham, Phil Rees, prominent journalist and producer, Maqsood Ahmed, Senior Advisor from Communities Ministry and Zahoor Niazi, Chief-Editor of Jang News London, Peter Sanders, prominent photographer. The thrust of every question revolved around the issue of terrorism, extremism and practical steps that could be taken to save Muslim Youth from these scourges. The participants gave cheering applause and kept clapping in response to the answers given to these questions by Shaykh-ul-Islam, which speaks volumes of the satisfaction they must have derived from this informed discourse.

Shaykh-ul-Islam reminded the youth attending the camp that they should not allow their love and association with the worldly life to exceed a particular limit. Rather they should focus on their morality, character and values so that they could not feel embarrassed in front of Prophet Muhammad on the Day of Judgement. He urged the youth to start implementing the teachings of Islam and following Prophet Muhammad ideal life for both material and spiritual success.

Denouncing extremism and terrorism, Shaykh-ul-Islam said that peace was the main message of Islam. He threw light on the difference between Jihad and Terrorism, saying that Prophet Muhammad prescribed guidelines to be followed during war etc. Muslims were prohibited from bringing any harm to non-combatants such as children, women, old people, and destroying orchards, animals and buildings of the enemy etc. "Whatever is being perpetrated in the name of religion is complete negation of what Islam stands for and it is clear violation of Islamic teachings," Shaykh-ul-Islam said while referring to Islamic history.

Shaykh-ul-Islam instructed the youth to devote themselves fully to obtaining an education and said that it is by playing positive role and making positive contribution to their respective societies that they can increase the esteem of their country and religion. He said that ideal character of forefathers was responsible for the spread of Islam around the globe, not the sword.

Shaykh-ul-Islam said that Minhaj-ul-Quran was promoting the real message of Islam through its network by engaging other religions and communities in constructive dialogue for better tomorrow. He urged the youth to stand up to the extremists and terrorist who were out to malign Islam through their practices in collaboration with their communities and government institutions. "This is through joint action and understanding that we can eliminate extremism and terrorism," he held.

The three-day camp concluded on the determination to work collectively to spread awareness about Islamic teachings and defeat terrorists at intellectual levels.

Al-Hidayah 2010 (University of Warwick) 
Al-Hidayah 2010 was held at The University of Warwick between 7 August and 9 August 2010 under the spiritual guidance of Shaykh-ul-Islam Dr. Muhammad Tahir-ul-Qadri. Al Hidayah held in 2010 was of great significance as it was the year Shaykh-ul-Islam released the world famous work titled Fatwa on Terrorism which is an Islamic edict condemning all forms of terrorism in the world.

At the opening press conference Shaykh-ul-Islam Dr. Muhammad Tahir-ul-Qadri shed light on the aims and objectives of the camp and emphasized on the reasons why he believes it is necessary to train the youth to tackle extremist ideologies. He said that this 3-day initiative is aimed at awakening Muslim youth to challenge the arguments of the extremist and to promote the need of collective action for promotion of peace, interfaith dialogue, and harmony and addressing the misunderstandings and confusions in the concepts of jihad, khilafah and democracy. Analyzing the emergence of terrorism, he said that cancer of terrorism does not emerge from nowhere but it begins as an ‘ideological infection’ which is a narrow interpretation and vision of Islam. It is misinterpretation of the Quran, Hadith and classical authorities of Islam. He said this process begins in mosques, schools, Universities, and through the internet by extremist groups. They initially start persuading their argument which leads towards brainwashing. He said that "terrorism is a cancer that begins from and an ideological infection."

Shaykh-ul-Islam said that following the publication of Fatwa on Terrorism, it put a stop to its practice of stereotyping Muslims and conveyed the Islamic message of tolerance, harmony and interfaith dialogue to a wide range of people and regions. This step dealt a lethal blow to the extremists and encouraged the reformers.

The event attracted over 1200 youngsters from all over United Kingdom and Europe.

Peace for Humanity Conference 2011 (Wembley Arena) 
‘Peace for Humanity’ Conference was held on 24 September 2011 at the Wembley Arena under the banner of Minhaj-ul-Quran UK. Shaykh-ul-Islam Dr. Muhammad Tahir-ul-Qadri presided over the Conference attended by 10000 people, which was also attended by human rights and peace activists, religious scholars, opinion leaders, and key leaders and followers of Islam.

In his address, Shaykh-ul-Islam said that the world needed peace, security and brotherhood more than before. He said that after 9/11, the difficulties of Muslims around the globe have increased manifold. The picture of Islam spread in the world has nothing to do with Islam and 99% of Muslims are peace-loving. He said that terrorism and extremism had affected Muslims more than the world. He said that thousands of people were killed in terrorist incidents, affecting millions of families. Extremism, he said, divided people and produced pessimism and despondency. He congratulated MQI UK on holding such a grand and purposeful Conference.

Al-Hidayah 2016 (Keele University, Staffordshire) 
Minhaj-ul-Quran UK Al-Hidayah project team arranged Al-Hidayah 2016 with a relevant and much-needed focus on developing future leadership. This year's event was the first three-day event since Al-Hidayah 2010, and the objectives of the event were geared towards nurturing and inspiring future leaders from amongst the youth.

Keele University in Staffordshire, was chosen as the venue for the event; set in 600 acres of scenic greenery and with all accommodations, facilities and events on campus, it provided the ideal environment for three days of learning and development.

It is also worthy of note that this was Minhaj-ul-Qur’an International's first three-day residential event of this size organized anywhere in the world outside of Pakistan, without the direct participation of the founder of Minhaj-ul-Qur’an International, his eminence Shaykh-ul-Islam Dr. Muhammad Tahir-ul-Qadri. However, the event was presided over by the main keynote speaker Shaykh Dr. Hussain Mohi-ud-Din Qadri (President of the Minhaj Education Society), eloquently and with an ideal blend of knowledge, inspiration and motivation.

Regional Events 2017 
In preparation for Al-Hidayah 2017 to be held at Keele University in Staffordshire between 26 August and 28 August, the Al-Hidayah team organized Al-Hidayah regional events in the cities of Glasgow, Luton, Walsall, and Manchester. The events emphasized the importance of the work of Minhaj-ul-Quran in our times and how youngsters can participate in propagating the works of Shaykh-ul-Islam Dr. Muhammad Tahir-ul-Qadri.

Al-Hidayah 2017 (Keele University, Staffordshire)
Al-Hidayah 2017 was held between the dates of 26–28 August 2017 at the historic Keele University in Staffordshire under the spiritual guidance of Shaykh-ul-Islam, Dr. Muhammad Tahir-ul-Qadri. More information can be found on Al-Hidayah

Al-Hidayah 2018 (Fletcher Hotel Doorwerth-Arnhem, Arnhem)
Al-Hidayah 2018 was held between the dates of 17–19 August 2018 at Fletcher Hotel Doorwerth-Arnhem in Arnhem under the spiritual guidance of Shaykh-ul-Islam, Dr. Muhammad Tahir-ul-Qadri. More information can be found on alhidayah.nl

References

External links
Official Website

Minhaj-ul-Quran
Islamic education
Non-profit organisations based in the United Kingdom